The Dismantling, also released in the United States under the title The Auction, is a 2013 Canadian drama film written and directed by Sébastien Pilote. It was screened in the Contemporary World Cinema section at the 2013 Toronto International Film Festival.

The film was a shortlisted nominee for Best Picture at the 2nd Canadian Screen Awards. It was also shortlisted for the Prix collégial du cinéma québécois in 2014.

Cast
 Gabriel Arcand as Gaby Gagnon
 Pierre-Luc Brillant as Caretaker
 Normand Carrière as Léo Simard
 Claude Desjardins as Auctioneer
 Sophie Desmarais as Frédérique Gagnon
 Éric Laprise as Bank employee
 Lucie Laurier as Marie Gagnon
 Dominique Leduc as Neighbor
 Gilles Renaud as Accountant / Friend
 Johanne-Marie Tremblay as Françoise

References

External links
 

2013 films
2013 drama films
2010s French-language films
Canadian drama films
Films directed by Sébastien Pilote
French-language Canadian films
2010s Canadian films